The 1988 Giro d'Italia was the 71st edition of the Giro d'Italia, one of cycling's Grand Tours. The Giro began in Urbino, with an individual time trial on 23 May, and Stage 12 occurred on 3 June with a stage from Novara. The race finished in Vittorio Veneto on 12 June.

Stage 12
3 June 1988 — Novara to Selvino,

Stage 13
4 June 1988 — Bergamo to Chiesa in Valmalenco,

Stage 14
5 June 1988 — Chiesa in Valmalenco to Bormio,

Stage 15
6 June 1988 — Bormio to Merano 2000,

Stage 16
7 June 1988 — Merano to Innsbruck,

Stage 17
8 June 1988 — Innsbruck to Borgo Valsugana,

Stage 18
9 June 1988 — Levico Terme to Valico del Vetriolo,  (ITT)

Stage 19
10 June 1988 — Borgo Valsugana to Arta Terme,

Stage 20
11 June 1988 — Arta Terme to Lido di Jesolo,

Stage 21a
12 June 1988 — Lido di Jesolo to Vittorio Veneto,

Stage 21b
12 June 1988 — Vittorio Veneto to Vittorio Veneto,  (ITT)

References

1988 Giro d'Italia
Giro d'Italia stages